Vishal Nikam (born February 10, 1994) is an Indian television actor known for participating and winning the Bigg Boss Marathi 3. He debut from Star Pravah's Saata Jalmachya Gathi.

Personal life 
Nikam was in relationship with his girlfriend Soundarya but they broke up in 2022 after four years of relationship.

Career 
Vishal started his career with the Marathi movie Mithun in 2018. In the next year, he featured in another Marathi movie Dhumas. In the same year, he got the lead role in Star Pravah's Saata Jalmachya Gathi. In 2020, he portrayed the role of Jotiba in Dakkhancha Raja Jotiba. 

In 2021, he was cast in the role of Shiva Kashid in Jay Bhawani Jay Shivaji serial. In the same year, he participated and won the Bigg Boss Marathi 3. In 2023, he played a role in Colors Marathi's Aai Mayech Kavach. 

Currently, he is shooting for his upcoming movie Vedat Marathe Veer Daudle Saat.

Filmography

Movie

Television

Music videos

References

External links
 

Reality show winners
Living people
Bigg Boss Marathi contestants
Big Brother (franchise) winners
Participants in Indian reality television series
1994 births
Marathi actors
Male actors in Marathi television
Male actors in Marathi cinema
Indian male soap opera actors